Al-Assad Sports Arena is the 2nd largest indoor sports hall in Aleppo, Syria. With a seating capacity of 3,500 spectators, the arena is designated to host basketball, handball and volleyball matches. Al-Assad Sports Arena is located in the central al-Jamiliyah district of Aleppo. It is the regular home of the domestic basketball competitions.

The construction of the arena was launched in 1968. However, the process was delayed several times due to political instability and the 1973 war with Israel. Finally, in 1978, the construction was completed and the arena was opened to host the matches of the Syrian Basketball League.

Throughout its history, the arena has been a regular home for concerts. Many prominent Syrian and Arab singers have performed in the hall including Sabah Fakhri, Mayada al-Hannawi, Shadi Jamil, Shahd Barmada, Elissa, Marcel Khalife, etc. Armenian Diaspora singers Harout Pamboukjian and Karnig Sarkissian have also performed in the arena.

Al-Assad Sports Arena is owned by the Government of Syria. It is operated by the Aleppo directorate of the Ministry of Education.

References

Sports venues in Aleppo
Handball venues in Syria
Basketball venues in Syria
Volleyball venues in Syria
Sports venues completed in 1978
1978 establishments in Syria
Indoor arenas in Syria